TSP or tsp may refer to:

Medicine 
 Tropical spastic paraparesis, weakness due to T-lymphotropic virus infection

Science and technology 
 Team software process, for producing software
 Telecommunications service provider
 .tsp, for telephony service provider, file extension for a Microsoft API
 Thiele/Small parameters, of a loudspeaker driver
 Thrombospondin, protein
 Time stamp protocol in cryptography
 Titanium sublimation pump, a type of vacuum pump
 Trailer stability program on Opel vehicles
 Transit signal priority, for buses
 Travelling salesman problem, optimization problem
 Trimethylsilyl-2,2,3,3-tetradeuteropropionic acid, derivative of tetramethylsilane
 Trisodium phosphate, cleaning agent
 TSP (econometrics software), programming language
 Tunnel Setup Protocol, in networking
 Time Synchronization Protocol, see timed
 Type Set Page, in E-publishing

Food and cooking 
 Teaspoonful, abbreviation
 Textured soy protein

Governmental 
 Taconic State Parkway, New York State, USA
 Telecommunications Service Priority in an emergency, USA
 Texas Student Publications, USA
 Threatened Species Protection Act 1995, Tasmania, Australia
 Thrift Savings Plan, USA
 Trust service provider

Internationally 
 Tajikistan Support Project, supporting healthcare
 Texas Star Party for astronomers
 TSP, IATA airport code for Tehachapi Municipal Airport, California, USA
 TSP, MTR station code for Tuen Mun Swimming Pool stop, Hong Kong

Political parties 
 National Harmony Party, former party in Latvia
 Taiwan Statebuilding Party
 Third Society Party, Taiwan

Other 
 The Stanley Parable, a 2011 video game developed by Galactic Cafe
 Toronto St. Patricks, an early name for the Toronto Maple Leafs of the National Hockey League